Cor (English: "color") is the fourth studio album by Brazilian duo Anavitória, released by surprise on 1 January 2021. Produced by Tó Bandileone (from 5 a Seco) and member Ana Caetano, it was prepared during the COVID-19 pandemic.

All tracks in the album received videos published on YouTube and directed by Leonardo Lobo, doismilium and Gabriela de Melo, except "Eu Sei Quem É Você", directed by Belle. The album cover was taken from the video for the opening track "Amarelo, Azul e Branco".

Production 
The album was recorded in Itaipava, a neighborhood of Petrópolis, a city in the mountainous regions of the state of Rio de Janeiro by Brazilian Eng. Ricardo Mosca. Its title came to Ana Caetano's mind during a trip between Petrolina (Pernambuco) and Juazeiro do Norte (Ceará) on 14 December 2019. It's a three-letter word meant to allude to the fact that Cor is their third album of original songs and that the group involves three people (Caetano, Vitória Falcão and manager Felipe Simas). Caetano commented that the number three is also a representation of the union of the body, the spirit and the mind.

On 31 December 2020, the duo published a picture on their Instagram account (which would later be revealed as the album cover) and the subtitle "COR, 00:00".

Cor opens with "Amarelo, Azul e Branco", an autobiographical song in which Rita Lee recites some verses. The second track, "Te Amar É Massa Demais", has elements of samba-reggae and Mauro Ferreira from G1 considered "Explodir" the "romantic pop fofolk typical of the band".

This Album was mastered by Brazilian Engineer Carlos Freitas at Classic Master Mastering Studios USA.

Critical reception 

Mauro Ferreira, from G1, called the production "outsticking" to the extent that, in some moments (such as "Tenta Acreditar"), he considered it and the arrangements to be more interesting than the tracks themselves. He noted that the album is "too long for the 2020s phonographic standards", but praised the fact that the duo did not release it "sliced" in EPs or singles, as he states it has become "usual in the market". He finished his review saying that Cor "exposes Ana Caetano and Vitória Falcão still stuck to a past that brought them premature glory" and that "it's hard not to allow oneself to be enslaved by success".

Accolades

Track listing

Personnel 
Data for "Cigarra" and "[dia 34]" unavailable.

Musicians 
 Ana Caetano – co-lead vocals on all tracks; choir on "Lisboa"
 Vitória Falcão – co-lead vocals on all tracks except "Ainda É Tempo"
 Tó Bandileone – guitar on all tracks except "Ainda É Tempo"; acoustic guitar on "Tenta Acreditar" and "Abril"; ukelele and percussion on "Cigarra" and "Lisboa"; programming on all tracks except "Ainda É Tempo"; bass synth on "Tenta Acreditar", "Selva", "Ainda É Tempo" and "Terra"; whistle on "Explodir"; synthesizer on "Explodir", "Carvoeiro" and "Lisboa"; mandolin and synth on "Eu Sei Quem É Você"; choir on "Explodir" and "Lisboa"
 Conrado Goys – guitar on all tracks except "Te Amar É Massa Demais", "Cigarra" and "Ainda É Tempo"; acoustic guitar on "Te Amar É Massa Demais", "Explodir", "Selva", "Eu Sei Quem É Você", "Terra", "Te Procuro", "Carvoeiro" and "Lisboa"
 Maro – acoustic guitar on "Explodir" and "Lisboa"
 Fabio Sá – bass on all tracks; esraj on "Tenta Acreditar"
 Mari Jacintho – keyboards on all tracks except "Cigarra" and "Ainda É Tempo", in which she plays the piano, and "Tenta Acreditar", "Terra", "Carvoeiro" and "Lisboa"
 Valmir Bessa – drums on all tracks except "Ainda É Tempo" and "Lisboa"
 Felipe Roseno – percussion on all tracks except "Ainda É Tempo", "Eu Sei Quem É Você", "Abril", "Te Procuro" and "Carvoeiro"
 Will Bone – trumpet, saxophone and tuba on "Amarelo, Azul e Branco", "Explodir", "Selva" and "Terra"; trombone on "Amarelo, Azul e Branco", "Explodir", "Selva", "Terra" and "Lisboa"; flute on "Selva" and "Terra"
 Maria Beraldo – clarinet and bass clarinet on "Lisboa"

Guest musicians 

 Rita Lee – spoken words on "Amarelo, Azul e Branco"
 Lenine – co-lead vocals on "Lisboa"

Technical personnel 
 Tó Brandileone – recording
 Ricardo Mosca – recording and mixing
 Carlos Freitas – Mastering at Classic Master USA studios
 Gabriela Schmdt – cover picture
 Isadora Silveira – production direction
 Felipe Simas – executive direction

Notes

References 

Portuguese-language albums
Pop albums by Brazilian artists
Anavitória albums
2021 albums
Latin Grammy Award for Best Portuguese Language Contemporary Pop Album